Ramón Báez Machado (1858–1929) was a physician and politician from the Dominican Republic.  He served as provisional president of the Dominican Republic from 28 August until 5 December 1914. He served as the President of Chamber of Deputies of the Dominican Republic in 1903. He was the son of president Buenaventura Báez. He later served as a public official under several cabinets including the government of President Horacio Vásquez.

He died in Santo Domingo on March 4, 1929.

Ancestry
Báez is descended by his mother, 'Conchita' Machado from the Spanish conquistadors Rodrigo de Bastidas and Gonzalo Fernández de Oviedo y Valdés, and by his father, President Buenaventura Báez, from the Jesuit priest and historian Antonio Sánchez Valverde.

Ramón Buenaventura Báez Méndez (1812–1884)
Teodoro Osvaldo Buenaventura Báez Machado (1857–?)
José Ramón Báez López-Penha (1909–1995)
Buenaventura Báez López-Penha
Marcos Antonio Báez Cocco
Ana Josefina Báez Cocco
Monika De Marchena Báez
Juan Rafael Vargas De Marchena
Patricia De Marchena Báez
Freddy III de Marchena Báez
Freddy Alejandro IV de Marchena Grullón
Jimena De Marchena Báez
Soraya Báez Cocco
Jesus Báez
Alejandro Antonio Báez Cocco
Ramón Báez Machado (1858–1929)
Buenaventura Báez Soler
Ramón Báez Romano
Ramón Buenaventura Báez Figueroa (b. 1956)
Ramón Buenaventura Báez Zeller (b. 1982)
José Ramón Báez Alvarez (b.1999)
José Miguel Báez Figueroa
Mercedes Báez Soler
Julio Ernesto de la Rocha Báez
Ramón de la Rocha Pimentel (b. 1951)
Clarissa Altagracia de la Rocha Pimentel de Torres (b. 1959)

References

 Rulers.org

1858 births
1929 deaths
20th-century Dominican Republic politicians
Descendants of Buenaventura Báez
Presidents of the Dominican Republic
Presidents of the Chamber of Deputies of the Dominican Republic
Dominican Republic people of Spanish descent
White Dominicans
Children of national leaders